[1,1'‑Bis(diphenylphosphino)ferrocene]palladium(II) dichloride is a palladium complex containing the bidentate ligand 1,1'-bis(diphenylphosphino)ferrocene (dppf), abbreviated as [(dppf)PdCl]. This commercially available material can be prepared by reacting dppf with a suitable nitrile complex of palladium dichloride:

dppf + PdCl(RCN) → (dppf)PdCl + 2 RCN (RCN = CHCN or CHCN)

The compound is popularly used for palladium-catalyzed coupling reactions, such as the Buchwald–Hartwig amination and the reductive homocoupling of aryl halides.

References

Palladium compounds
Phosphine complexes
Catalysts
Ferrocenes
Chloro complexes